Rezaul Karim Reza is a Bangladeshi professional footballer who plays as a centre back for Bangladesh Premier League club Abahani Limited Dhaka and the Bangladesh national team. He can also play as a left back.

References

1987 births
Living people
People from Chandpur District
Bangladeshi footballers
Bangladesh international footballers
Sheikh Russel KC players
Association football fullbacks
Footballers at the 2010 Asian Games
Bashundhara Kings players
Asian Games competitors for Bangladesh
Bangladesh Football Premier League players